Kranked is a series of extreme freeride mountain-biking films.

Since 1997, Bjørn Enga producer/director for Radical Films has specialized in extreme mountain bike cinematography. His work is well regarded within the freeride mountain bike community internationally.

Series 
 Kranked - Live to Ride, 1998
 Kranked 2 - Trails from the Crypt, 1999
 Kranked 3 - Ride Against the Machine, 2000
 Kranked 4 - Search for the Holey Trail, 2001
 Kranked 5 - In Concert, 2003
 Kranked 6: Progression, 2006 
 Kranked 7: The Cackle Factor, 2008
 Kranked 8: Revolve, 2009

Awards
 Trial & Error: Peoples Choice Award 
 Kranked :Revolve : People Choice Award Banff Mountain Film Festival 2009

Trivia
Kranked 6 was bundled with Microsoft's Zune.

See also 
Freeride
Freeride mountain-biking movies

References

External links 
 Radical Films Kranked Series

Mountain biking films
American short documentary films
Documentary films about cycling